Pseudodiplectanum is a genus of monopisthocotylean monogeneans, belonging to the family Diplectanidae.
Species of Pseudodiplectanum are parasites of marine teleost fish (Pleuronectiformes and Osteoglossiformes).

Species
According to the World Register of Marine Species, the following species are included in the genus:

 Pseudodiplectanum bychowskii Nagibina, 1977 
 Pseudodiplectanum caballeroi Nagibina, 1977 
 Pseudodiplectanum cynoglossum Tripathi, 1955 
 Pseudodiplectanum gibsoni Oliver, 1987 
 Pseudodiplectanum kearnei Vala, Lopez-Roman & Aboudaoud, 1980 
 Pseudodiplectanum kearni Oliver, 1980 
 Pseudodiplectanum lucknowense Agrawal & Sharma, 1986 
 Pseudodiplectanum syrticum Derbel, Boudaya & Neifar, 2007

References

Diplectanidae
Monogenea genera
Parasites of fish